The 2005–06 Algerian Championnat National was the 44th season of the Algerian Championnat National since its establishment in 1962. A total of 16 teams contested the league, with USM Alger as the defending champions.

Team summaries

Promotion and relegation 
Teams promoted from Algerian Division 2 2005-2006 
 OMR El Annasser
 JSM Bejaïa
 ASM Oran

Teams relegated to Algerian Division 2 2006-2007

 CS Constantine
 USM Annaba
 US Biskra

League table

Season statistics

Top scorers

References

External links
2005–06 Algerian Championnat National

Algerian Championnat National
Championnat National
Algerian Ligue Professionnelle 1 seasons